RRT or Rrt may refer to:

 Radio Reconnaissance Platoon
 Railroad Tycoon (series)
 Rainbow Round Table
 Rapidly exploring random tree
 Reference Rendering Transform (Academy Color Encoding System)
 Registered Respiratory Therapist
 Renal replacement therapy
 Randomized response technique
 Rational root theorem in mathematics
 Refugee Review Tribunal in Australia.
Recommended Replacement Time (In Pacemaker and Internal Defibrillator, time to replace the device because of exhaustion of the batteries)

 Rapid Relief Team